La Voz Argentina is an Argentine reality talent show that premiered on Telefe in 2012. Based on the reality singing competition The Voice of Holland, the series was created by Dutch television producer John de Mol.

Overview
The series is part of The Voice franchise and is based on a similar competition format in the Netherlands entitled The Voice of Holland won by Ben Saunders. The first Argentine series will be hosted by Marley, with Candelaria Molfese serving as the backstage and social networking correspondent. The winner will receive a record deal with Universal Republic.

The show will be the second singing competition broadcast by Telefe, after the success of the Argentine version of Operación Triunfo, that was aired from 2003 to 2009. It will compete against another singing competition broadcast by the competitor channel, El Trece, Cantando por un Sueño, hosted by José María Listorti.

Format
The series consists of three phases: a blind audition, a battle phase, and live performance shows. Four coaches, all noteworthy recording artists, choose teams of contestants through a blind audition process. Each coach has the length of the auditioner's performance (about one minute) to decide if he or she wants that singer on his or her team; if two or more coaches want the same singer (as happens frequently), the singer has the final choice of coach.

Each team of singers is mentored and developed by its respective coach. In the second stage, called the battle phase, coaches have two of their team members battle against each other directly by singing the same song together, with the coach choosing which team member to advance from each of individual "battles" into the first live round. Within that first live round, the surviving four acts from each team again compete head-to-head, with public votes determining one of two acts from each team that will advance to the final eight, while the coach chooses which of the remaining three acts comprises the other performer remaining on the team.

In the final phase, the remaining contestants compete against each other in live broadcasts. The television audience and the coaches have equal say 50/50 in deciding who moves on to the final 4 phase. With one team member remaining for each coach, the (final 4) contestants compete against each other in the finale with the outcome decided solely by public vote.

Coaches timeline

Teams 

  Winner
  Runner-up
  Third place
  Fourth place

Coaches' advisors

Series overview

Seasons' summaries

Season 1

Season 2

Season 3

Season 4

References

2010s Argentine television series
2012 Argentine television series debuts
Argentina
Argentine reality television series